Jan Sport, sometimes known simply as Jan, is the stage name of Charlie Mantione (born Charles Joseph Mantione), an American drag queen and singer based in New York City, who came to international attention on the twelfth season of RuPaul's Drag Race. On May 26th, 2021, she was announced as one of the 13 contestants on the sixth season of RuPaul's Drag Race All Stars, where she placed 7th overall.

Early life 
Mantione was born on June 11, 1993, in Old Bridge Township, New Jersey. He attended Christian Brothers Academy for high school. While attending school, he participated in both sports and theater. He was an avid soccer player until 17. Mantione participated in a number of school productions such as Oklahoma! and played Troy Bolton in a production of High School Musical. He attended the Boston Conservatory (which has since merged with the Berklee College of Music) for musical theater.

Career 
Mantione formed the pop group Stephanie's Child along with queens Rosé and Lagoona Bloo in 2018. His drag mother is Alexis Michelle. In 2018, he won the title of Breakthrough Artist and was nominated for Best Vocalist at the 2018 NY Nightlife Awards. When he first started drag, he frequently appeared as a Kris Jenner impersonator.

Mantione appeared on The Voice Season 13 finale with Jessie J and competed on America's Got Talent with Stephanie's Child.

RuPaul's Drag Race 
Jan's casting on the twelfth season of RuPaul's Drag Race was announced on January 23, 2020. On the show, she is referred to as simply "Jan" to avoid trademark issues with the backpack brand. She ended up in the bottom two in episode eight and was eliminated after losing a lip-sync to Widow Von'Du, finishing in seventh place.

While the show was airing, Jan contributed to a YouTube web series called Jan's Jukebox where she performed covers of the songs that queens had lip-synced to on the show that week, such as "S&M" by Rihanna and "This Is My Night" by Chaka Khan. The latter performance, which was the song she lip-synced to on the episode in which she was eliminated, was dedicated to her grandfather who had died due to complications of COVID-19.

On May 26, 2021, it was revealed that Jan would return to compete on RuPaul's Drag Race All Stars Season 6 alongside 12 other contestants. On the 4th episode of the show, she won the main challenge (Halftime Headliners) for her impression of Lady Gaga at the 2017 Halftime show and later lost the Lip-Sync For Your Legacy to Britney Spears' "Womanizer" against Lip-Sync Assassin Jessica Wild. She ultimately placed seventh, being eliminated by Trinity K. Bonet in episode 7. Her elimination marks the first time in All Stars history where the Lip-Sync Assassin (Alexis Mateo) revealed both of the bottom queens’ names (Jan and Pandora Boxx) as a result of a tie from the group vote. RuPaul revealed that, under such circumstances, the tie would have to be broken by the Top All-Star of the week (Trinity K. Bonet).

Filmography

Television

Web series

Discography

Singles
 "Slag Wars"  (2020)
 "Gay Hands Up"  (2021)
"Jantasy"  (2021)

Featured singles
"You Don't Know Me" (with the cast of RuPaul's Drag Race Season 12) (2020)
"Madonna: The Unauthorized Rusical" (with the cast of RuPaul's Drag Race Season 12) (2020)
"The Shady Bunch" (with the cast of RuPaul's Drag Race Season 12) (2020)
"Show Up Queen" (with the cast of RuPaul's Drag Race All Stars Season 6) (2021)

As a part of Stephanie's Child
Christmas Dolls, Vol. 1 (2020)

Titles

See also
 LGBT culture in New York City
 List of LGBT people from New York City

References

External links
 

1993 births
Living people
American dancers
American drag queens
American male singers
Boston Conservatory at Berklee alumni
People from New Jersey
People from New York City
RuPaul's Drag Race contestants
RuPaul's Drag Race All Stars contestants
The Voice (franchise) contestants
America's Got Talent contestants